Eady is a surname. Notable people with the surname include:

Alyse Eady (b. 1988), American news anchor
Charles Eady, (1870–1945), Australian cricketer
Charles Swinfen Eady, 1st Baron Swinfen, (1851–1919), British lawyer and judge
Cornelius Eady, (b. 1954), American poet
David Eady, (b. 1943), English High Court judge
David Eady (film director) (b. 1924), British film director and producer
Dorothy Eady, (1904–1981), English Egyptologist
Eric Eady (1915–1966), British meteorology researcher
George Eady (1865–1941), British politician
Hanna Eady (b. 1956), Palestinian-American actor and playwright
Jason Eady, American musician
Josh Eady, Canadian producer
Lewis Alfred Eady (1891–1965), New Zealand businessman
Marshall Thomas Wilton Eady, Australian engineer
Robin Eady (1940–2017), British physician
Roger Swinfen Eady, 3rd Baron Swinfen (b. 1938), British peer
Wilfred Griffin Eady (1890–1962), British treasury official and diplomat

See also
Baron Swinfen

English-language surnames
Surnames of English origin